SWA Sharks Football Club is a football club of Turks and Caicos, which was established in 1999 and plays in the WIV Provo Premier League. It was one of the founded club to set up the league.
In the season of 2000/2001 the sharks won the league title for the first time since the League began in 1999 and in the same year won the TCIFA Presidents Cup.

Current squad 2022

2022 Caribbean Club Shield

References

Football clubs in the Turks and Caicos Islands
1999 establishments in the Turks and Caicos Islands
Association football clubs established in 1999